The Steyr M1912, also known as the Steyr-Hahn, is a semi-automatic pistol developed in 1911 by the Austrian firm Steyr Mannlicher, based on the mechanism of the Roth–Steyr M1907. It was developed for the Austro-Hungarian Army and adopted in 1912. It was the standard Austro-Hungarian military handgun of World War I. It was able to endure the adverse conditions of trench warfare during World War I.

The M1912 was originally chambered for the 9mm Steyr round.

History

The M1912 was developed as the Model 1911, a military pistol, but it was not accepted into service until 1914 as the M12. It was originally issued to the Austrian Landwehr while common army units were issued Roth–Steyr M1907 handguns and Rast & Gasser M1898 revolvers. Orders were also placed by Chile and Romania. During World War I, Austria-Hungary experienced shortages of handguns and production of the M1912 was increased. Germany also placed an order for 10,000 Model 12s. After World War I, a commercial model the Steyr M1911 was produced and was quite popular with army officers, but Steyr had to rely on foreign exports to sustain production. After Germany annexed Austria in 1938, the Wehrmacht ordered 60,000 M1912 pistols rechambered to 9mm Parabellum which remained in service until the end of World War II.

Design details
The Steyr M1912 handgun is operated by a system of short recoil, the barrel unlocking from the slide by rotation. As the pistol is being fired and the recoil of the pistol is in motion, a lug and groove system around the barrel rotate the barrel 20° until a lug hits a stop wedge and holds the barrel while the slide is free to continue its rearward travel, the extractor claw withdrawing the spent casing against the breech face of the slide until the casing strikes the ejector and departs the weapon via the ejection and loading port. Shortly after ejection the slide's rearward travel is arrested by the compressed recoil spring and the abutment of mated surfaces of the slide and frame. The recoil spring is now free to return its stored energy to the cycle of the weapon by beginning to return the slide forward.

As the return spring returns the slide forward, the breech face strips a round from the magazine into the chamber and the locking system engages the barrel and locks it with the slide in the battery position. A safety lever on the left side of the frame can be engaged by turning it into a notch on the slide to immobilize the slide. A disconnector system will also prevent the weapon from firing until the whole action is fully closed.

Although the magazine is situated in the grip, it is integral with the weapon and is loaded from above using eight-round stripper clips. To load, the slide is pulled back to expose the action, the clip is inserted along the guides and the rounds pushed into the magazine. The metal strip is then discarded. As with the majority of pistols with integral magazines, a lever can be used to disengage the magazine catch in order to eject the magazine load.

Variants

9mm P12(Ö)
After Germany annexed Austria in 1938, the Wehrmacht ordered 60,000 M1912 pistols rechambered in 9mm Parabellum which remained in service until the end of World War II. In German service, its official designation was 9mm P12(Ö) (Ö for Österreichisch, "Austrian"). Pistols in Wehrmacht service were distinguished by the Wehrmachtadler ("Wehrmacht Eagle") emblem above the trigger and most noticeably a "P-08" or "08" stamp on the left side of the slide, "to show that they chambered German 1908-type ammunition."

Doppelpistole M.12
A dual pistol mount and stock was also developed that converted two M1912/P16s into a (double pistol) submachine gun such weapon known as the Doppelpistole M1912. However, only a handful were made before it was abandoned.

Repetierpistole M1912/P16

During World War I, a machine pistol version of the Steyr M1912 called the Repetierpistole M1912/P16 was produced. It used a 16-round fixed magazine loaded via 8-round stripper clips, a detachable shoulder stock and a large exposed semi-auto/full-auto selector on the right side of the frame above the trigger (down = semi and up = full). Rate of fire was about 800 to 1000 rounds per minute. Only 960 M1912/P16 were made.

Users	

:Obtained after World War I, in use up to World War II

:In use after independence

Notes

References

Bibliography

External links

 Steyr-Hahn Pistol Commercial Model 1911 and Army Model 1912 
 Doppelpistole M.12
 
 
 

Steyr semi-automatic pistols
Semi-automatic pistols of Austria
9mm Parabellum semi-automatic pistols
World War I submachine guns
Machine pistols
Early semi-automatic pistols
Steyr Mannlicher
World War I Austro-Hungarian infantry weapons
World War II infantry weapons of Germany
World War II infantry weapons of Italy
Weapons and ammunition introduced in 1912